George W. Wilson (1843–1900) was a Commissioner of Internal Revenue at the Internal Revenue Service (IRS) in the United States.

Life and career 
Wilson was born on September 13, 1843, in Preble County, Ohio.

During the American Civil War, Wilson became a private in the Union Army as part of the Fifty-fourth Ohio Volunteer Infantry at the age of eighteen. He left the army at the end of the war as a first lieutenant.

In 1866, Wilson began to practice law. In 1969, Wilson began working for the Internal Revenue Service where he served in various positions. He eventually became head of the IRS.

Wilson served as IRS Commissioner from March 1, 1899, to November 27, 1900.

Wilson died on November 27, 1900, in Washington, D.C.

References 

1843 births
1900 deaths
Commissioners of Internal Revenue
McKinley administration personnel
Union Army soldiers
People from Preble County, Ohio